Haya is a monotypic genus of plant in the family Caryophyllaceae. It is endemic to Yemen's Socotra island.  The Plant List recognises the single species Haya obovata. Haya obovata grows in subtropical or tropical dry shrubland and rocky areas.

References

Caryophyllaceae
Endemic flora of Socotra

Plants described in 1884
Taxonomy articles created by Polbot
Taxa named by Isaac Bayley Balfour